Shaheer Nawaz Sheikh (born 26 March 1984) is an Indian actor and model who mainly works in Hindi television. In 2009, he made his acting debut with the television show Kya Mast Hai Life playing Veer Mehra and then appeared as Anant Bajpai in Navya..Naye Dhadkan Naye Sawaal. In 2013, he got his breakthrough with the role of Arjuna in Mahabharat for which he received widespread acclaim.

In 2015, he took a break from Indian television and made his Indonesian television debut with Cinta di Langit Taj Mahal and also appeared as a host on various shows. He appeared in Indonesian films, including Turis Romantis and Maipa Deapati & Datu Museng. He is popularly known as the "Srk Of Indonesia" due to his widespread popularity in the country.

Shaheer made his Indian television comeback in 2016, with the critically acclaimed show Kuch Rang Pyar Ke Aise Bhi, playing Dev Dixit and portrayed Salim in Dastaan-E-Mohabbat Salim Anarkali. In 2019, he portrayed Abir Rajvansh in the successful show Yeh Rishtey Hain Pyaar Ke. Sheikh has established himself as one of the most popular television actors in India.

Sheikh made his web debut with Paurashpur in 2020. He also appeared as Manav Deshmukh in the web show Pavitra Rishta- Its Never Too Late. In addition to TV shows, he has appeared in many music videos. As of 2022, Sheikh is portraying Krishna Choudhary in Woh Toh Hai Albelaa.

Early life
Sheikh was born on 26 March 1984, in Bhaderwah, Doda, Jammu and Kashmir to Shahnawaz Sheikh and Dilshad Sheikh. He also has two sisters, Aleefa and Ifrah. He has completed his schooling from Hari Singh Higher Secondary School, Jammu. He has done his graduation in Bachelor of Laws (L.L.B.) from New Law College, Bharati Vidyapeeth University, Pune.

Personal life 
After dating for almost two years, Sheikh married Ruchikaa Kapoor on 19 October 2020 in a court wedding, after which they had celebrations in Jammu and Mumbai. Kapoor is the marketing head and senior vice-president at Balaji Motion Pictures. On 9 September 2021, they became parents to a baby girl, Anaya.

Career

Debut and early career (2009–2012) 
After pursuing L.L.B, he started working for a law firm after which he started his career as a photographer. Then, he went on to modelling.

In 2009 Sheikh made his television debut in Kya Mast Hai Life, where he played Veer Mehra, a teenager who loves music and playing guitar. After second season of the show ended, Sheikh was seen in Jhansi Ki Rani as Nana Sahib, brother of Rani of Jhansi replacing Satyajeet Dubey.

In 2011, Sheikh was approached to play the lead in television show, Navya..Naye Dhadkan Naye Sawaal opposite Saumya Seth. He played Anant Bajpai, a 19-year-old college boy who looks like any other urban boy but deep down he is a traditionalist and a conformist. Alongside Navya, Sheikh also worked in Disney Channel's show Best Of Luck Nikki in season 1 as Ritesh. In 2012, Sheikh also appeared in the telefilm shown in Star Plus' show Teri Meri Love Stories opposite Mahhi Vij.

Breakthrough and acting in Indonesia (2013–2015) 
In 2013, he signed Swastik Productions' Mahabharat. He played Arjuna, an incredible archer, a warrior prince and the third Pandava in the series which ended in August 2014. For his performance he got lot of appreciation. For the series, he underwent several trainings including fitness, horse riding and weapon training for almost eight months. Mahabharat was a huge critical and commercial success. It was said to have recorded the highest GTVMs ever achieved by any other serial in the history of Indian Television. It was also popular in Indonesia, establishing Sheikh as a big star of the country, often credited as the 'SRK of the country'. His chemistry with his co-star Pooja Sharma who played Draupadi's role, was also highly adored by fans. After Mahabharat, he did various projects in Indonesia which made him even more popular there.

In 2014, he hosted Indonesian reality television Panah Asmara Arjuna and a variety show The New Eat Bulaga! Indonesia along with his costars from Mahabharat. In 2015, he co-hosted the television talent show Asia's Got Talent with Marc Nelson. Co-starring Nabila Syakieb and Ravi Bhatia, he also featured in a romantic drama, Cinta di Langit Taj Mahal as Reehan Syahputra, a calm and composed guy. In 2015, Sheikh landed a lead role in a romantic comedy film Turis Romantis opposite actress Kirana Larasati where he played Azan Khan, a handsome photographer from India, who befriended Nabil, a tough and beautiful tourist guide in Yogyakarta.

Acclaim and established actor (2016–2020)
In 2016, Sheikh made his come back to Indian television with Sony TV's critically acclaimed television show, Kuch Rang Pyar Ke Aise Bhi alongside Erica Fernandes and Supriya Pilgaonkar. He played Devrath Dixit (Dev), a young and successful business tycoon. Sheikh's performance and his onscreen chemistry with Erica was appreciated. In September 2017, the show came back with its second season.

Along with Kuch Rang Pyar Ke Aise Bhi he also did episodic roles and gave guest appearances in many Indonesian television series. He was seen as Raden Petir in Roro Jonggrang, as Salman in Malaikat Kecil Dari India, as Aladin/Ali Besar in Aladin & Alakadam, as Prince Zamzaman Jinny Oh Jinny Datang Lagi, as Mr. Thakur in Gara Gara Duyung, as Rahul in Tuyul & Mba Yul Reborn and in a guest appearance in I-KTP. In 2016, he also starred opposite Masayu Anastasia in an Indonesian telefilm Namaku Yusuf wherein he played the titular role of Yusuf.

In February 2017, he started working on his upcoming Indonesian feature film Maipa and Datu Museng, an action based periodic love story in which Sheikh played the role of Datu Museng, a warrior. The film released on 11 January 2018. In 2018, he portrayed Salim in Colors TV's Dastaan-E-Mohabbat: Salim Anarkali. He was paired opposite Sonarika Bhadoria.

From March 2019 to October 2020, he played Abir Rajvansh in Star Plus's Yeh Rishtey Hain Pyaar Ke, opposite Rhea Sharma. Producer Rajan Shahi stated his role as dynamic.

Web debut and further expansion (2021-present)
He made his web debut with Paurashpur starring Annu Kapoor, Shilpa Shinde, Milind Soman and Flora Saini. In 2021, he reprised the role of Dev Dixit in Kuch Rang Pyar Ke Aise Bhi 3 alongside Erica Fernandes. The story progressed from where it ended in the second season.

In July, he signed Pavitra Rishta: Its Never Too Late, which was an OTT project as a tribute to actor Sushant Singh Rajput, who essayed the lead role of Manav in ithe first season. Shaheer stepped into his shoes, with some changes to the plot as well as characterization. It released on 15 September 2021, garnering commendable response from audience, much to the current situation. On 28 January Pavitra Rishta: Its Never Too Late 2.0 was released.

In 2022, Sheikh starred in Yatri Kripya Dhyan De , a short film alongside Shweta Basu Prasad. Since March 2022, he is seen as Krishna Choudhary in Star Bharat's Woh Toh Hai Albelaa opposite Hiba Nawab.

In the media
In 2017, Sheikh topped in Times list of 20 Most Desirable Men on Indian Television. Next year he earned 4th spot in same list. In 2019 he earned 3rd spot in same list. In 2020 he earned the 4th spot in same list.

Sheikh was ranked in The Times 50 Most Desirable Men at No. 50 in 2017, at No. 29 in 2019, at No. 38 in 2020.

In 2016, 2018 and 2019 he was placed at the 25th, 17th and 11th position in Eastern Eye's 50 Sexiest Asian Men List.

In August 2018, he was chosen as first Indian torch bearer of the 18th Asian Games by Indonesian Government.

Filmography

Television

Special appearances

Films

Web series

Music videos

Accolades

References

External links 

 

1984 births
Living people
Indian expatriates in Indonesia
Indian male soap opera actors
21st-century Indian male actors
Indian male television actors
Indian male models
Indian television presenters
Male actors from Jammu and Kashmir
People from Bhaderwah